Karlıova is a town and seat of the Karlıova District in Bingöl Province of Turkey. The mayor is Veysi Bingöl (AKP). The town had a population of 9,016 in 2021 and is populated by Kurds.

The town is divided into the neighborhoods of Kale, Kanireş, Kanitaht, Seyrantepe, Turgut Özal and Yeşilyurt.

See also
 Karlıova Triple Junction
 1949 Karlıova earthquake

External links
 District governor's official website

References

Populated places in Bingöl Province
Kurdish settlements in Bingöl Province
Towns in Turkey
Karlıova District